Niroshan Perera  is a Sri Lankan politician, a member of the Parliament of Sri Lanka. He belongs to the United National Party. He is the son of Festus Perera and Larine Perera.

References

Sri Lankan Roman Catholics
Members of the 14th Parliament of Sri Lanka
Members of the 15th Parliament of Sri Lanka
Samagi Jana Balawegaya politicians
United National Party politicians
1971 births
Living people
State ministers of Sri Lanka
Sinhalese politicians